The All-night vigil is a service of the Eastern Orthodox and Byzantine Catholic churches consisting of an aggregation of the canonical hours of Compline (in Greek usage only), Vespers (or, on a few occasions, Great Compline), Matins, and the First Hour.  This service may be performed (commencing the evening before) on any Sunday or major feast,
any feast for which a Litia is prescribed; these feasts are marked in the Typikon and in liturgical calendars by a Greek cross printed in red in a properly-shaped semicircle [open at the top].

Order 
When celebrated at the all-night vigil, the orders of Great Vespers and Matins vary somewhat from when they are celebrated separately. In parish usage, many portions of the service such as the readings from the Synaxarion during the Canon at Matins are abbreviated or omitted, and it therefore takes approximately two or two and a half hours to perform.

Note that the Psalms cited below are numbered according to the Septuagint, which differs from that found in the Masoretic.

Great Vespers

Note that on the Eves of Nativity, Theophany, and the Annunciation, Great Compline is usually prescribed rather than Great Vespers.

 Great Censing of the entire church by the priest with a deacon going before him holding a large candle. In Greek practice, this is during compline, but in Russian practice, in silence 
 The opening blessing that is otherwise used for matins  by the priest: "Glory to the holy, consubstantial, life-creating, and indivisible Trinity, always, now and ever, and unto ages of ages"
 "Come let us worship God our king" and  "Psalm of creation", Psalm 103
 Great Litany
 First Kathisma, only the first stasis on a feast day, but in its entirely on a Sunday otherwise
 Little Litany
 "Lord I have cried" (psalms 140, 141, 129, 116), with appointed stichera, ending with the Dogmatic Theotokion, a hymn addressed to the Theotokos
 Entrance 
 O gladsome light
 Prokeimenon for the day of the week
 Old Testament readings on a feast day
 Augmented Litany
 The prayer, "Vouchsafe, O Lord"
 Litany of Askings
 Litia on a feast day
 Aposticha
 Now lettest Thou thy servant depart in peace recited by the ecclesiarch (although sung in Russian parish usage)
 The Trisagion prayers
 Apolytikion appointed for the feast or on a Sundays otherwise, "Rejoice, O Virgin Theotokos..."
 Artoklasia if there was a Litia
 "Blessed be the name of the Lord", Psalm 33 (first ten verses), and a blessing by the priest

Matins
 "Glory to God in the highest", "O Lord, open Thou my lips"
 Six Psalms (Psalms 3, 37, 61, 87, 102, and 142)
 Great Litany
 Theos Kyrios, verses from Psalm 117
 Apolytikion—on Sundays: from the Octoechos; otherwise, for the feast—and its appropriate Theotokion
 Kathisma
 Little Litany
 Sessional hymns
 Kathisma 
 Little Litany
 Sessional hymns
 Polyeleon or Kathisma
 Megalynarion , in Russian usage, on a feast day
 Resurrectional Troparia, "The Angelic Council..." on Sundays and during Pascaltide
 Little Litany
 Anabathmoi
 Hypakoe
 Matins Prokeimenon
 Matins Gospel
 "Having beheld the Resurrection of Christ" on Sundays and during Pascaltide
Psalm 50 ("Have mercy on me, O God", Miserere'') 
 Prayer by the priest, "O God save thy people and bless thine inheritance..."
 Canon
 Little Litany
"Holy is the Lord our God" on Sundays
 Exapostilarion
 Praises (Psalms 148 to 150, with stichera)
 Great Doxology ("Glory to God in the highest")
 Appointed troparia
 Augmented Litany
 Litany of Askings
 Dismissal
 Polychronion
 First Hour

Modern classical musical compositions
Besides numerous traditional chants of several schools, the following classical compositions by famous composers include: 
The vigil has been set to music most famously by Sergei Rachmaninoff, whose setting of selections from the service is one of his most admired works. Tchaikovsky's setting of the all-night vigil, along with his Divine Liturgy and his collection of nine sacred songs were of seminal importance in the later interest in Orthodox music in general, and settings of the all-night vigil in particular. Other musical settings include those by Chesnokov, Grechaninov, Ippolitov-Ivanov, Alexander Kastalsky, Clive Strutt and Einojuhani Rautavaara. It is most often celebrated using a variety of traditional or simplified chant melodies based on the Octoechos or other sources.

Notes

References

External links
Description of a "real" All Night vigil in Russia By Professor Mikhail Skaballanovich (1911)
 
 

Eastern Christian liturgies
Byzantine Rite
Liturgy of the Hours
Prayer